Ivica "Ivo" Grlić (born 6 August 1975) is a Bosnian-Herzegovinian former professional footballer who played as a midfielder. He served as sporting director for MSV Duisburg.

Grlić was a free kick specialist, scoring a large number of goals from standards, both for his clubs and for the Bosnia and Herzegovina national football team. In 2007, he announced retirement from international football, to concentrate on playing for his club.

International career
He made his debut for Bosnia and Herzegovina in an April 2004 friendly match against Finland and has earned a total of 16 caps, scoring 2 goals. His final international was an October 2006 European Championship qualification match against Greece.

International goals
Scores and results list Bosnia and Herzegovina's goal tally first, score column indicates score after each Grlić goal.

References

External links

1975 births
Living people
Footballers from Munich
Association football midfielders
Citizens of Bosnia and Herzegovina through descent
Croats of Bosnia and Herzegovina
Bosnia and Herzegovina footballers
Bosnia and Herzegovina international footballers
FC Bayern Munich II players
SC Fortuna Köln players
1. FC Köln players
Alemannia Aachen players
MSV Duisburg players
Regionalliga players
Oberliga (football) players
Bundesliga players
2. Bundesliga players
German footballers
West German footballers